Airbles railway station serves the Airbles area of Motherwell, North Lanarkshire in Scotland.

History 
The station was a new construction in 1989 by British Rail, on the Hamilton Circle.

The station missed out on services from the new Larkhall branch because the reopened line connects in a westerly direction as a result of the M74 now being in the location of the previous easterly junction.

Services

2016 
The current service pattern, Mondays-Saturdays is:

 2tph to Dalmuir via Hamilton Central and Glasgow Central Low Level
 2tph to Motherwell, with an hourly extension to Cumbernauld

The Sunday service is:

 2tph to Milngavie, via Hamilton and Glasgow Central Low Level
 2tph to Motherwell

2022 - Anderson Tunnel Closure 
Due to engineering work in the Anderson tunnel between Rutherglen and Exhibition Centre between the 13th of March till the 8th of May, the service frequency will be altered to:

Monday - Saturday:

 1tph to Glasgow Central High Level via Hamilton, Newton and Mount Florida
 1tph to Motherwell with only peak time services extending to Cumbernauld

Sunday:

 1tph to Glasgow Central High Level via Hamilton, Newton and Mount Florida
 1tph to Motherwell

Trains that run to Cumbernauld on the weekdays and Saturdays will only be operated between Motherwell and Cumbernauld during the closure apart from the extra peak time service.

Replacement bus services will operate from Newton and call between stations from Newton to Partick.

References

Notes

Sources 

 
 

Buildings and structures in Motherwell
SPT railway stations
Railway stations in North Lanarkshire
Railway stations opened by British Rail
Railway stations in Great Britain opened in 1989
1989 establishments in Scotland
Railway stations served by ScotRail